The 2021 East Carolina Pirates baseball team represents East Carolina University during the 2021 NCAA Division I baseball season. The Pirates play their home games at Clark–LeClair Stadium as a member of the American Athletic Conference They are led by head coach Cliff Godwin, in his seventh year as head coach.

Previous season

The 2020 East Carolina Pirates baseball team notched a 13–4 (0–0) regular-season record. The season prematurely ended on March 12, 2020, due to concerns over the COVID-19 pandemic.

References 

2021 American Athletic Conference baseball season
2021
2021 in sports in North Carolina
East Carolina